Qian Jialing (born February 3, 1988) is a Chinese archer and is a former world number one. She won the silver medal in the team competition at the 2006 Asian Games.

References

Living people
1988 births
Chinese female archers
Place of birth missing (living people)
Asian Games medalists in archery
Archers at the 2006 Asian Games
Asian Games silver medalists for China
Medalists at the 2006 Asian Games
21st-century Chinese women